Anssi Kippo (born 1976) is a Finnish record producer (a recording project's creative and technical leader). He who founded Astia Studios in 1994 and has produced and engineered many musical acts over the years. Kippo continues to manage both Astia A and B studios.

References

External links
 Astia-studio official home page
 Astia-studio official VKontakte page
 Astia Studio official SoundCloud page
 Photographs of Anssi Kippo working and having fun, by independent photographer Anton Chernyshevich
 
 

Living people
1976 births
Finnish record producers